The Net is a 1923 American silent melodrama film directed by J. Gordon Edwards and starring Barbara Castleton, Raymond Bloomer, and Albert Roscoe. It is a film adaptation of the 1919 Broadway play of the same name, itself based on the novel The Woman's Law by Maravene Thompson. The film depicts the story of Allayne Norman (Castleton) and her husband Bruce (Bloomer). Bruce commits murder and convinces Allayne to help him blame the crime on a man suffering from amnesia (Roscoe). After Bruce dies and the man recovers, he marries Allayne.

The film's release was delayed almost a year from its originally announced date. Contemporary reviews were mixed to negative. Like many of Fox Film's early works, it was likely lost in the 1937 Fox vault fire.

Plot
Allayne Norman's husband Bruce is a drunkard and gambler. Finally unable to tolerate his behavior, she goes to her artist cousin for assistance. Her husband follows her to demand more money. The resulting argument and fight ends with Bruce killing his wife's cousin. Shortly thereafter, an amnesiac man enters the studio. In an effort to avoid the consequences of his actions, Bruce places his identifying documents in the man's pockets, then flees the studio with Allayne and their son.

The police are unable to determine what has occurred, but identify the man as Bruce Norman based on the planted papers, and send him to what they presume to be his home, in the hope that the presence of family will aid the return of his memory. Fearing the truth would result in her son being known as the child of a murderer, Allayne identifies the man as her husband while Bruce remains in hiding.

When Bruce returns, he attempts to kill the man who has taken his place. He fails and is shot instead. The man regains his memory, allowing him to be cleared of wrongdoing. Having fallen in love during their time together, Allayne and the man marry.

Cast

Alma Bennett was initially reported as a member of the cast, but the American Film Institute believes she did not appear in the finished film. This was Castleton's final film appearance.

Production
Maravene Thompson's The Woman's Law was originally serialized in The American Magazine between November 1913 and April 1914 before being published as a novel in 1914. The first film version was produced Arrow Film and distributed by Pathé in 1916. Thompson adapted her novel into a play, titled The Net, which was performed at Broadway's 48th Street Theatre. Channing Pollock praised the quality of the production and cast, which included Claire Whitney, but found elements of the story unconvincing. It ran for eight showings and was considered a success.

In December 1922, Fox Film announced the addition of six films to its schedule for planned release in January 1923, including an adaptation of The Net. However, filming had not begun on The Net at that time and its release was repeatedly delayed. In January, the studio claimed that director J. Gordon Edwards was "screening the final scenes" and set a February 25 release date. In April, it was still advertised for the "coming season", but by October it was described as a "1924 drama". The Net was finally screened on December 2, 1923.

It was also released internationally: in France in February 1924, Argentina in March, and Brazil in August.

Reception and legacy
The Net was not well-received by critics.  The Film Daily was scathing, calling the film a "feeble attempt at entertainment" with a "terrible story" and inadequate cast. They also reported the opinions of local critics. Despite issues with the plot, the Rochester, New York reviewer was generally positive; however, the Cleveland review opined that the "acting doesn't warrant complimentary adjectives". Photoplay was also mostly negative, but thought the film might appeal to fans of Bertha M. Clay.

The Net is believed to be lost. The 1937 Fox vault fire destroyed most of Fox's silent films, and the Library of Congress is not aware of any extant copies. Because little of Edwards's work survives, few of his films have drawn attention from modern authors, but film historian Larry Langman described The Net as an example of the 1920s trend to use amnesia as a plot element in crime films.

See also
 List of lost silent films (1920–1924)

Notes

References

Bibliography

External links

 
 

1923 films
1923 drama films
American black-and-white films
American films based on plays
American silent feature films
Films directed by J. Gordon Edwards
Fox Film films
Lost American films
1923 lost films
Films based on adaptations
Lost drama films
1920s American films